The New Mexico State Aggies women's basketball team represents New Mexico State University in Las Cruces, New Mexico, United States. They are a member of the Western Athletic Conference.

History
New Mexico State began play in 1973. They were members of the Intermountain Athletic Conference from 1974–1982, the High County Athletic Conference from 1983–1990, the Big West Conference from 1991–2000, and the Sun Belt Conference from 2001–2005 before joining the Western Athletic conference in 2005. They lost in the conference tournament championship game in 2006, 2007, and 2008 before winning the WAC title in 2015 and 2016. The Aggies have won regular season titles in 1987 (shared), 1988, 1995, 2003 (West Division, shared), 2015, and 2016. They made the WNIT in 1994 and 2010. They have lost in the first game of all four NCAA Tournaments they have played in (with a second round appearance in 1988 due to a bye). As of the end of the 2015–16 season, they have an all-time record of 662–572.

NCAA tournament results

References

External links
 

 
1973 establishments in New Mexico
Basketball teams established in 1973